Luis Cruz  (born October 10, 1985) is a Puerto Rican professional boxer who challenged for the IBF  lightweight title in 2017.

Amateur career
Had 71 amateur fights. Record was 50-21. Won the National Youth title two years in a row and was on the Puerto Rican national team for two and a half, three years - on 'Team B.' It was the alternate team.

Highlights
 2006 JOSE CHEO APONTE TOURNAMENT, Caguas, Puerto Rico, 125 pounds: in the semifinals on 3-24-06 he lost a 9-8 decision against Alex Oliveira of Brazil.
 2006 INDEPENDENCE CUP, Santiago de los Caballeros, Dominican Republic, 125 pounds: in the quarterfinals on 3-15-05 he lost a 15-9 decision against Dario de la Cruz of Dominican Republic.
 JOSE CHEO APONTE TOURNAMENT, Caguas, Puerto Rico, 125 pounds: in his first fight on 6-3-05 he had a 9-9 draw, but lost the tiebreaker against William Silva of Brazil.

Professional career
He debuted at the age of 21 on March 3, 2007 in San Juan, PR, and knocked out Jose Gonzalez (0-2) at 1:23 of the 1st round.

Professional boxing record

External links

1985 births
Living people
People from Las Piedras, Puerto Rico
Super-featherweight boxers
Puerto Rican male boxers